Kelucharan Mohapatra (8 January 1926 – 7 April 2004) was a legendary Indian classical dancer, guru, and exponent of Odissi dance, who is credited with the revival and popularizing of this classical dance form in the 20th century.
He is the first person to receive the Padma Vibhushan from Odisha.

A noted Sanskrit poet of India writes on this Guru: Saango-paanga-subhangi-laasya-madhuram samteerna-nrutyaarnavam, which translates as - "Each fraction of his dancing body leads to paramount sweetness, through miraculous poses and postures. In fact, Guru Kelucharan Mohapatra crossed the ocean of styles."

Early life and history
In his youth, Kelucharan Mohapatra performed Gotipua - a traditional dance form of Odisha where young boys dress up as woman to praise Lord Jagannath. Later in his life he did extensive research on Gotipua and Mahari dance, which lead him to restructure Odissi dance. Guru Kelucharan Mohapatra was a master in Percussion instruments - Mardala and Tabla, which clearly resonates in his dance compositions. He was also skilled in the traditional Pattachitra painting.

Kelucharan Mohapatra along with his wife, Laxmipriya Mohapatra, herself a dancer, and their son Ratikant Mohapatra built Srjan in 1993.

Awards

 Sangeet Natak Akademi Award, 1966
 Padma Shri, 1974
 Padma Bhushan, 1988
 Sangeet Natak Akademi Fellowship, 1991
 Padma Vibhushan, 2000
 Kalidas Samman from Madhya Pradesh government

Quotes made by Kelucharan Mohapatra 
 "Odissi is not a mere dance form to entertain people but to inspire and elevate. I don't actually dance but pray in compassion and the spectators say that this `form' is dancing."
 "The real dance must convey the feeling of undivided existence, that a spectator can feel that he is not different from the thing observed".

References

8. His work was referred in the movie  as being life-changing that forged the path for the protagonists love for the dance.

Further reading

 The Making of a Guru: Kelucharan Mohapatra, His Life and Times, by Ileana Citaristi. Published by Manohar, 2001. .
 The Dancing Phenomenon: mad boy, by Sharon Lowen, Kelucharan Mohapatra, Avinash Pasricha. Lustre Press, Roli Books, 2001. .

External links
 
 Homage to a Guru at Rediff.com
Video links
 
 
 
 

1926 births
2004 deaths
Indian dance teachers
Recipients of the Padma Vibhushan in arts
Recipients of the Padma Bhushan in arts
Recipients of the Padma Shri in arts
Recipients of the Sangeet Natak Akademi Award
Recipients of the Sangeet Natak Akademi Fellowship
People from Puri district
Odissi exponents
Performers of Indian classical dance
Indian classical choreographers
Dance education in India
Teachers of Indian classical dance
Indian choreographers
20th-century Indian dancers
Dancers from Odisha
20th-century Indian educators
Educators from Odisha